Elam Russell Vangilder (April 23, 1896 – April 30, 1977) was an American professional baseball pitcher in the Major Leagues from -. He played for the St. Louis Browns and Detroit Tigers.

An effective pitcher despite his high walk rate, Vangilder compiled a 99-102 record with a 4.28 ERA in 367 major league appearances. 

Vangilder was an above-average hitter for a pitcher and was occasionally used as a pinch hitter. He finished his career with a .243 batting average (146-for-601) with 61 runs scored, 8 home runs, and 50 RBI. His best year with the bat was 1922 when he hit .344 (32-for-93) with 2 home runs and 11 RBI for the St. Louis Browns.

After his playing career, Vangilder returned to his hometown of Cape Girardeau, Missouri, where he lived out his life on his dairy farm.

External links

1896 births
1977 deaths
Major League Baseball pitchers
St. Louis Browns players
Detroit Tigers players
Baseball players from Missouri
Sportspeople from Cape Girardeau, Missouri
Union City Greyhounds players